Elen Willard (born November 19, 1935) is an American retired character actress who worked in American network dramatic television series from 1960-66. Her first aired performance was a supporting role in a 1960 episode of the short-lived CBS detective series, Markham.

Career
Collectively, over a six-year period, Willard portrayed twenty-four characters in twenty different dramatic television series consisting of various featured guest star and supporting performances, including most notably Alcoa Presents: One Step Beyond, Perry Mason, Ben Casey, Dr. Kildare, Combat!, Gunsmoke, Whispering Smith, and Have Gun - Will Travel.

Willard may be best-known for her standout portrayal of the character Ione Sykes in the gothic-themed western episode of the science fiction/fantasy/horror anthology series The Twilight Zone entitled "The Grave", with a cast that included Lee Marvin, Lee Van Cleef, Strother Martin, James Best, and Stafford Repp. Her last aired appearance was in a December 1966 Christmas-themed episode of The Man from U.N.C.L.E. entitled "The Jingle Bells Affair".

During the final two years of her career, she guest starred in four episodes of the ABC/Quinn Martin World War II based series Twelve O'Clock High. Actor Earl Holliman, who guest starred opposite Willard in the second of her four appearances in Twelve O'Clock High, said in an interview for a book on that series published in 2005 that he had "... heard she had quit acting because it was such an emotionally painful experience for her."

References

External links
 

1941 births
Living people
American television actresses
20th-century American actresses
People from Los Angeles
21st-century American women